Tschudi's tapaculo (Scytalopus acutirostris) is a species of bird in the family Rhinocryptidae. It is endemic to Peru.

Taxonomy and systematics

Tschudi's tapaculo was previously considered a subspecies of Magellanic tapaculo (Scytalopus magellanicus) but was elevated to species status based on differences in their vocalizations.

Description

Males weigh  and females . The adult male is dark gray above and lighter gray below; the flanks have a very light brownish wash. The female is paler overall, its rump has a brown wash, and its flanks and crissum (the area around the cloaca) are tawny with black bars. The juvenile has bars and spots.

Distribution and habitat

There it inhabits the undergrowth of humid cloud forest. Unlike several other tapaculos, it is rarely found in bamboo.

Behavior

Feeding

The diet of Tschudi's tapaculo appears to be mostly insects but also includes seeds. No information is available about its foraging technique.

Breeding

No information is available other than that a juvenile was collected in August.

Vocalization

The call is repeated single notes .

Status

The IUCN has assessed Tschudi's tapaculo as being of Least Concern. Though it has a small range and its population has not been quantified, they are both believed large enough to support that rating.

References

Tapaculo, Tschudi's
Scytalopus
Birds described in 1844
Taxonomy articles created by Polbot